Rock Hall is a historic home located at Lawrence in Nassau County, New York. It was built about 1767 and stands on a manorial, park-like setting overlooking Jamaica Bay.  It is a -story, Georgian-style frame dwelling, with a T-shaped frame wing.  It is five bays wide, with a central portico shielding the main entry.  During the early 1950s the town of Hempstead restored Rock Hall to its 18th-century appearance.

It was listed on the National Register of Historic Places in 1976.

References

External links
 

Rock Hall Museum website

Houses on the National Register of Historic Places in New York (state)
Historic American Buildings Survey in New York (state)
Houses completed in 1767
Five Towns
Historic house museums in New York (state)
Museums in Nassau County, New York
Houses in Nassau County, New York
1767 establishments in the Province of New York
National Register of Historic Places in Nassau County, New York